Rumaythah ibn Muḥammad ibn ‘Ajlān ibn Rumaythah ibn Abī Numayy al-Ḥasanī was Emir of Mecca and Vice Sultan in the Hejaz in 1416.

He surrendered Mecca to Hasan ibn Ajlan on the night of 26 Shawwal 819 AH (c. 16 December 1416).

References

15th-century people
Emirs